Scut or SCUT may refer to:

 Scut, a short tail on various mammals
 Scutwork, menial work
 Adam Scut (fl. 1382–1401), English politician
 Scut Farkus, a fictional character in the film A Christmas Story
 South China University of Technology (pinyin: Huánán Lǐgōng Dàxué), a public university in Guangzhou, China

See also
 Scute or scutum, a bony plate or scale overlaid with horn, on animals